The 2005 Bavarian Cup was the eighth edition of this competition, organised by the Bavarian Football Association (BFV), which was started in 1998. It ended with the Jahn Regensburg winning the competition. Together with the finalist, FC Ingolstadt 04, both clubs were qualified for the DFB Cup 2005-06.

The competition is open to all senior men's football teams playing within the Bavarian football league system and the Bavarian clubs in the Regionalliga Süd (III).

Rules & History
The seven Bezirke in Bavaria each play their own cup competition which in turn used to function as a qualifying to the German Cup (DFB-Pokal). Since 1998 these seven cup-winners plus the losing finalist of the region that won the previous event advance to the newly introduced Bavarian Cup, the Toto-Pokal. The two finalists of this competition advance to the German Cup. Bavarian clubs which play in the first or second Bundesliga are not permitted to take part in the event, their reserve teams however can. The seven regional cup winners plus the finalist from last season's winners region are qualified for the first round.

Participating clubs
The following eight clubs qualified for the 2006 Bavarian Cup:

Bavarian Cup season 2004-05 
Teams qualified for the next round in bold.

Regional finals

 The Jahn Regensburg, runners-up of the Oberpfalz Cup is the eights team qualified for the Bavarian Cup due to the club's reserve team having won the Cup in the previous season.

First round

Semi-finals

Final

DFB Cup 2005-06
The two clubs, Jahn Regensburg and FC Ingolstadt 04, who qualified through the Bavarian Cup for the DFB Cup 2005-06 both were knocked out in the first round of the national cup competition:

References

Sources
 Deutschlands Fussball in Zahlen 2004/05  Yearbook of German football, author: DSFS, publisher: Agon Sport Verlag, published: 2005, page: 280

External links
 Bavarian FA website  

2005
Bavarian